Sohran (also Romanized as Sohrān; also known as Sagrān, Sagrūn, Segryun, Sohrown, and Sohrūn) is a village in Arzil Rural District, Kharvana District, Varzaqan County, East Azerbaijan Province, Iran. At the 2006 census, its population was 95, in 25 families.

References 

Towns and villages in Varzaqan County